7 O' Clock is a 2006 Kannada romance film produced by N. M. Suresh under "Sri Thulaja Bhavani Creations" banner. It is directed and written by Santosh Rai Pathaje. Mithun Tejaswi and Pooja Kanwal appeared in lead roles, both making their debuts. Nithya Menen also debuted through this film in supporting role in Kannada. The film was a box office failure.

Plot
Nithya (Pooja Kanwal) loves to play pranks by calling someone everyday morning and making them a 'Bakra'. But one day she gets trapped by Rahul (Mithun Tejaswi) who is over smart. Soon Rahul and Nithya decide to meet at 7 o'clock in the railway station. Nithya says she is coming in yellow salwar and Rahul says he will be wearing a blue shirt. Nithya is a budding doctor while Rahul is a painter who wants to meet his lover and then complete one of his paintings. Rahul has a mobile and Nithya is averse to mobile phones. At the dot of 7 o'clock the train fails to come as it is two hours late.

Nithya and Rahul are upset with this delay. Rahul's mobile is stolen in the railway station and the only way for him is to contact Nithya is at her residence. She is not there because she is waiting at the railway station for Rahul. The anxiety among the audiences shoots up. The twist in the climax is when both meet not knowing each other's identity. Rahul's marriage is also fixed but on the engagement day the interference of a thief (who stole Rahul's mobile, paintings etc. in the train) changes the whole situation.

Cast
Mithun Tejaswi as Rahul
Pooja Kanwal as Nithya
Nithya Menen as Anu
Komal Kumar
Sonal Vengurlekar
 Dileep Raj
Sneha
Bhavya
Ramakrishna
Lavanya Bhardwaj
Sharan
Manish Goplani
Rangayana Raghu
 M. S. Umesh
Rumi Khan
Sundar Raj
Ankush Arora

Soundtrack
All the songs are composed and scored by M. S. Madhukar.

References
 https://www.indiaglitz.com/7o-clock-review-kannada-movie-7990
https://www.chitraloka.com/movie-reviews/676-7o-clock-review.html
https://www.nowrunning.com/movie/2789/kannada/7-o-clock/692/review.htm

External links 
 

2006 films
2000s Kannada-language films
Indian romance films
2000s romance films